Skrudaliena Parish is an administrative unit of Augšdaugava Municipality in the Selonia region of Latvia.

Towns, villages and settlements of Skrudaliena Parish 
 Skrudaliena

 
Parishes of Latvia
Selonia